Monte Sissone (3,330 m) is a mountain in the Bregaglia Range of the Alps, located on the border between Italy and Switzerland. Its summit is the tripoint between the Val Bregaglia (in Graubünden), Val Masino and Val Malenco (both in Lombardy)

On its northern side, the mountain overlooks the Forno Glacier.

References

External links
 Monte Sissone on Hikr

Mountains of the Alps
Alpine three-thousanders
Mountains of Switzerland
Mountains of Lombardy
Italy–Switzerland border
International mountains of Europe
Mountains of Graubünden
Val Bregaglia